Below are select minor league players and the rosters of the minor league affiliates of the Oakland Athletics:

Players

Garrett Acton

Garrett Patrick Acton (born June 15, 1998) is an American professional baseball pitcher in the Oakland Athletics organization.

Acton attended Lemont High School in Lemont, Illinois. He was drafted by the Chicago White Sox in the 35th round of the 2016 Major League Baseball draft, but did not sign and played college baseball at the University of Illinois Urbana-Champaign. He finished his career at Illinois with a school record 25 career saves.

Acton signed with the Oakland Athletics as an undrafted free agent after the 2020 Major League Baseball Draft, which was shortened because of the Covid-19 pandemic. He made his professional debut in 2021 with the Stockton Ports and Lansing Lugnuts. He started 2022 with the Midland RockHounds before being promoted the Las Vegas Aviators.

Euribiel Angeles

Euribiel Angeles (born May 11, 2002) is a Dominican professional baseball infielder in the Oakland Athletics organization.

Angeles signed with the San Diego Padres as an international free agent in 2018. He made his professional debut in 2019 with the Dominican Summer League Padres. In 2021 he played for the Lake Elsinore Storm and Fort Wayne TinCaps.

On April 3, 2022, Angeles, along with Adrián Martínez, was traded to the Oakland Athletics for Sean Manaea.

Tyler Baum

Tyler Cole Baum (born January 14, 1998) is an American professional baseball pitcher in the Oakland Athletics organization.

Baum attended West Orange High School in Winter Garden, Florida. Going into the 2016 playoffs, he held a 7–0 record and a 2.07 ERA with 70 strikeouts. The team advanced to the final four, but fell in the state qualifying game to Marjory Stoneman Douglas High School.

Baum went unselected in the 2016 Major League Baseball draft, and he enrolled at the University of North Carolina where he played college baseball. In 2017, Baum's freshman season, he started 15 games and pitched 63 innings in which he went 7–0 with a 2.57 ERA. That summer, he played collegiate summer baseball for the Harwich Mariners of the Cape Cod Baseball League, where he was named a league all-star and posted a 5-1 record on the mound. As a sophomore in 2018, he made 18 appearances (12 starts), going 4–1 with a 4.57 ERA. He returned to play for Harwich after the season. In 2019, he appeared in 17 games (making 16 starts), pitching to a 7–3 record and a 3.87 ERA. After the season, he was selected by the Oakland Athletics in the second round (66th overall) of the 2019 Major League Baseball draft.

Baum signed with Oakland for $900,000 and made his professional debut with the Vermont Lake Monsters of the Class A Short Season New York–Penn League. Over 11 starts, he went 0–3 with a 4.70 ERA, striking out 34 batters over  innings. He did not play a minor league game in 2020 due to the cancellation of the minor league season caused by the COVID-19 pandemic, but was added to Oakland's 60-man player pool and spent the summer training at their alternate site. Baum missed the beginning of the 2021 season and did not make his season debut until mid-August with the Rookie-level Arizona Complex League Athletics with whom he gave up 17 earned runs and twenty walks over  innings. He was assigned to the Stockton Ports of the Single-A California League to open the 2022 season, but was reassigned to the Arizona Complex League. He continued to struggle with control, going 1-1 with a 17.00 ERA, 47 walks, and 32 strikeouts over 27 innings between both teams.

Lawrence Butler

Lawrence Evan Butler (born July 10, 2000) is an American professional baseball first baseman and outfielder in the Oakland Athletics organization.

Butler attended Westlake High School in Atlanta, Georgia. He was drafted by the Oakland Athletics in the sixth round of the 2018 Major League Baseball Draft. Butler made his professional debut that year with the Arizona League Athletics. He played 2019 with the Vermont Lake Monsters.

Due to the cancellation of the 2020 Minor League Baseball season due to COVID-19, Butler did not play for a team. He returned in 2021 to play for the Stockton Ports and Lansing Lugnuts.

Butler was optioned to the Double-A Midland RockHounds to begin the 2023 season.

Denzel Clarke

Denzel Leslie Clarke (born May 1, 2000) is a Canadian professional baseball outfielder in the Oakland Athletics organization.

Clarke attended Everest Academy in Thornhill, Ontario, Canada. He was drafted by the New York Mets in the 36th round of the 2018 Major League Baseball Draft, but did not sign and played college baseball at California State University, Northridge. After three years at Northridge, he was drafted by the Oakland Athletics in the fourth round of the 2021 MLB Draft and signed.

Clarke made his professional debut with the Arizona Complex League Athletics. He started 2022 with the Stockton Ports before being promoted to the Lansing Lugnuts. In July, he was selected to play in the All-Star Futures Game.

Jack Cushing

John Gowen Cushing (born December 3, 1996) is an American professional baseball pitcher in the Oakland Athletics organization.

Cushing attended Edward S. Marcus High School in Flower Mound, Texas where he played baseball. After graduating in 2015, he played four years of college baseball at Georgetown University. He was selected by the Oakland Athletics in the 22nd round of the 2019 Major League Baseball draft.

Cushing signed with Oakland and split his first professional season between the Arizona League Athletics and Vermont Lake Monsters, going 3-6 with a 6.00 ERA over 42 innings. He did not play a game in 2020 due to the cancellation of the minor league season. He opened the 2021 season with the Stockton Ports and was promoted to the Lansing Lugnuts and Midland RockHounds during the season. Over 21 games (19 starts) between the three teams, Cushing went 7-7 with a 3.22 ERA and 111 strikeouts over  innings. He began the 2022 season with Midland and was promoted to the Las Vegas Aviators in mid-June. After struggling to a 14.14 ERA over 21 innings with the Aviators, he was demoted back to Midland in mid-July. Over 19 starts with Midland, he went 11-3 with a 3.67 ERA and 95 strikeouts over  innings.

Georgetown Hoyas bio

Jasseel De La Cruz

Jasseel De La Cruz (born June 26, 1997) is a Dominican professional baseball pitcher in the Oakland Athletics organization. De La Cruz is currently a phantom ballplayer, having spent stints in 2020 and 2021 on the Braves' active roster but never having appeared in a major league game.

De La Cruz signed with the Atlanta Braves as an international free agent on June 1, 2015. He spent his first professional season of 2015 with the DSL Braves, going 0–1 with a 7.11 ERA in 6 innings. He split the 2016 season between the DSL and the GCL Braves, going a combined 4–0 with a 2.18 ERA in 41 innings. He split the 2017 season between the GCL and the Danville Braves, going a combined 2–4 with a 3.80 ERA in  innings. He played for the Rome Braves in 2018, going 3–4 with a 3.83 ERA in 69 innings. De La Cruz split the 2019 season between Rome, Florida Fire Frogs, and Mississippi Braves, going a combined 7–9 with a 3.25 ERA over 133 innings.

De La Cruz was added to the Braves 40–man roster following the 2019 season. On September 15, 2020, De La Cruz was promoted to the major leagues for the first time. He was optioned down the next day without making a major league appearance. On May 8, 2021, De La Cruz was again promoted to the majors but was again sent down on May 10 without playing. Following the conclusion of the 2021 season, De La Cruz was not tendered a contract, making him a free agent.

On March 13, 2022, De La Cruz re-signed with the Braves organization on a minor league contract. He elected free agency after the 2022 season.

On November 29, 2022, De La Cruz signed a minor league deal with the Oakland Athletics.

J. T. Ginn

John Thomas Ginn (born May 20, 1999) is an American professional baseball pitcher in the Oakland Athletics organization.

Ginn graduated from Brandon High School in Brandon, Mississippi. In 2017, as a junior, he batted .482 with 16 home runs. That summer, he pitched in the 2017 Under Armour All-America Baseball Game at Wrigley Field. As a senior, he batted .419 with nine home runs and 27 RBIs along with pitching to a 5-1 record and 0.36 ERA and was named the Mississippi Gatorade Baseball Player of the Year. He signed to play college baseball at Mississippi State.

The Los Angeles Dodgers selected Ginn with the 30th overall selection of the 2018 MLB draft. On July 5, 2018, he announced that he was going to honor his commitment to Mississippi State and that he would not be signing with the Dodgers. In 2019, his freshman year at Mississippi State, he went 8-4 with a 3.36 ERA over 16 starts, striking out 103 over eighty innings. He was named the 2019 Southeastern Conference Freshman of the Year. He underwent Tommy John surgery in March 2020.

Ginn was selected 52nd overall by the New York Mets in the 2020 MLB draft. He signed with the Mets on June 30, 2020 for a $2.9MM bonus. He did not play a minor league game in 2020 due to the cancellation of the minor league season caused by the COVID-19 pandemic alongside still recovering from surgery. Ginn returned to play in June 2021, making his professional debut with the St. Lucie Mets of the Low-A Southeast. He was promoted to the Brooklyn Cyclones of the High-A East in July. Over 18 starts between the two teams, Ginn went 5-5 with a 3.03 ERA and 81 strikeouts over 92 innings.

On March 12, 2022, Ginn and Adam Oller were traded to the Oakland Athletics in exchange for Chris Bassitt. He opened the season with the Midland RockHounds of the Double-A Texas League.

Michael Guldberg

Michael Erling Guldberg (born June 22, 1999) is an American professional baseball outfielder in the Oakland Athletics organization.

Guldberg attended Walton High School and played college baseball at Georgia Tech. For his collegiate career, he had a .374 batting average (eighth in school history) and three home runs. After his junior year in 2020, he was selected by the Oakland Athletics in the third round of the 2020 Major League Baseball draft.

Guldberg signed with Oakland and made his professional debut in 2021 with the Lansing Lugnuts, slashing .259/.347/.420 with five home runs, 18 RBIs, and 11 stolen bases over only 48 games due to injury. He spent the 2022 season with the Midland RockHounds. Due to injury, he played only 52 games in which he hit .277/.353/.331 with 18 RBIs and seven doubles. He was selected to play in the Arizona Fall League for the Mesa Solar Sox after the season.

Georgia Tech Yellow Jackets bio

Brett Harris

Brett Steven Harris (born June 24, 1998) is an American professional baseball third baseman in the Oakland Athletics organization.

Harris attended John Hersey High School in Arlington Heights, Illinois, where played baseball and graduated from in 2016. He enrolled at the University of Houston to play college baseball but did not appear in a game, and transferred to Central Arizona College for the 2018 season. He then transferred to Gonzaga University where he played three years of college baseball, batting .355 with six home runs during his senior season in 2021. He was also named the West Coast Conference Defensive Player of the Year. After the season, he was selected by the Oakland Athletics in the seventh round of the 2021 Major League Baseball draft.

Harris signed with the team and made his professional debut with the Arizona Complex League Athletics and was promoted to the Lansing Lugnuts during the season. Over 27 games between both teams, he batted .238 with three home runs. He opened the 2022 season with Lansing and was promoted to the Midland RockHounds in late May. Over 113 games between the two teams, he slashed .290/.374/.475 with 17 home runs, 63 RBIs, and 11 stolen bases.

Gonzaga Bulldogs bio

Hogan Harris

Hogan Anthony Harris (born December 26, 1996) is an American professional baseball pitcher in the Oakland Athletics organization.

Harris attended St. Thomas More Catholic High School in Lafayette, Louisiana. In 2015, his senior year, he went 6–1 with a 0.67 ERA, earning All-State honors.

Undrafted in the 2015 Major League Baseball draft, he enrolled at University of Louisiana at Lafayette where he played college baseball. In 2016, Harris' freshman year at UL Lafayette, he appeared in 16 games (two starts) in which he went 2–0 with a 3.90 ERA. That summer, he played collegiate summer baseball with the Wareham Gatemen of the Cape Cod Baseball League. As a sophomore in 2017, he compiled a 5–2 record with a 2.66 ERA over 13 games (12 starts), striking out 87 batters over  innings. He returned to the Cape Cod League after the season's end and played for the Yarmouth–Dennis Red Sox. In 2018, Harris' junior season, he missed the first six weeks of the season due to an oblique injury, but eventually returned and went 5–2 with a 2.62 ERA over 12 games (11 starts).

Following his junior season, Harris was selected by the Oakland Athletics in the third round of the 2018 Major League Baseball draft and signed. He made his professional debut in 2019 with the Vermont Lake Monsters of the Class A Short Season New York–Penn League before being promoted to the Stockton Ports of the Class A-Advanced California League in July. Over 15 games (13 starts) between the two clubs, Harris pitched to a 1–5 record with a 2.80 ERA, striking out 65 batters over  innings.

Harris did not play a minor league game in 2020 due to the cancellation of the minor league season caused by the COVID-19 pandemic. He missed all of the 2021 season due to an undisclosed injury. He was selected to play in the Arizona Fall League for the Mesa Solar Sox after the season with whom he gave up eight earned runs and 14 walks, alongside striking out 14 batters, over ten innings. He was assigned to the Lansing Lugnuts of the High-A Midwest League to begin the 2022 season. In mid-June, he was promoted to the Midland RockHounds of the Double-A Texas League. In mid-August, he was promoted to the Las Vegas Aviators of the Triple-A Pacific Coast League. Over 23 games (22 starts) between the three teams, he went 2-4 with a 3.42 ERA and 105 strikeouts over  innings.

On November 15, 2022, the Athletics selected Harris's contract and added him to the 40-man roster. Harris was optioned to Triple-A Las Vegas to begin the 2023 season.

Darell Hernáiz

Darell Giovan Hernáiz (born August 3, 2001) is a Puerto Rican professional baseball infielder in the Oakland Athletics organization.

Hernáiz attended Americas High School in El Paso, Texas. He was drafted by the Baltimore Orioles in the fifth round of the 2019 Major League Baseball Draft. He made his professional debut that year with the Gulf Coast Orioles.

Hernáiz did not play for a team in 2020 due to the Minor League Baseball season being cancelled because of the Covid-19 pandemic. He returned in 2021 to play for the Delmarva Shorebirds. He started 2022 with Delmarva before being promoted to the Aberdeen IronBirds.

Hernáiz was traded to the Oakland Athletics on January 26, 2023 for pitchers Kyle Virbitsky and Cole Irvin.

Brian Howard

Brian Edward Howard (born April 25, 1995) is an American professional baseball pitcher in the Oakland Athletics organization.

Howard attended St. Louis University High School in St. Louis, Missouri. In 2013, his senior year, he went 8–2 with a 0.60 ERA and 89 strikeouts over seventy innings, earning Metro Catholic Conference Pitcher of the Year honors. Undrafted out of high school in the 2013 Major League Baseball draft, he enrolled at Texas Christian University (TCU) where he played college baseball for the TCU Horned Frogs.

In 2014, Howard's freshman season at TCU, he pitched to a 2.77 ERA over 13 innings. That summer, he played in the Northwoods League for the Wisconsin Woodchucks. In 2015, as a sophomore at TCU, he pitched 46 innings, compiling a 4–0 record, a 3.52 ERA, and 46 strikeouts. As a junior in 2016, Howard went 10–2 with a 3.19 ERA in 17 starts. After his junior year, he was drafted by the Houston Astros in the 17th round of the 2016 Major League Baseball draft, but did not sign. In 2017, his senior year, he pitched to a 12–3 record with a 3.77 ERA over 19 starts (leading the nation), striking out 113 batters over 105 innings. He earned Big 12 Conference Honorable Mention. Following the season, he was drafted by the Oakland Athletics in the eighth round of the 2017 Major League Baseball draft, and signed.

After signing with Oakland, Howard made his professional debut with the Vermont Lake Monsters of the Class A Short Season New York–Penn League. Over  innings, he compiled a 2–1 record and a 1.15 ERA. Howard began the 2018 season with the Stockton Ports of the Class A-Advanced California League, with whom he was named an All-Star, before being promoted to the Midland RockHounds of the Class AA Texas League in June. Over 24 games (23 starts) between the two clubs, he pitched to an 11–7 record and a 2.91 ERA, striking out 140 batters over  innings. In 2019, he began the year with Midland, earning Texas League All-Star honors. In July, he was promoted to the Las Vegas Aviators of the Class AAA Pacific Coast League. Over 27 starts between the two clubs, Howard pitched to an 8–9 record with a 4.30 ERA, striking out 134 over  innings.

He did not play a minor league game in 2020 due to the cancellation of the minor league season caused by the COVID-19 pandemic. Howard returned to play for the Aviators in 2021, pitching to a 7-4 record and 5.86 ERA over 24 games (21 starts), striking out 96 batters over  innings. He returned to Las Vegas for the 2022 season. Over 42 games (three starts), he went 3-1 with a 6.72 ERA and 65 strikeouts over  innings.

Jorge Juan

Jorge Miguel Juan (born March 6, 1999) is a Dominican professional baseball pitcher in the Oakland Athletics organization.

Juan signed with the Oakland Athletics as an international free agent in August 2017. Juan did not play in a game in 2020 due to the cancellation of the minor league season because of the COVID-19 pandemic. The Athletics added him to their 40-man roster after the 2021 season. He was designated for assignment on May 8, 2022, released and then resigned to a minor league deal a day later.

Mason Miller

Mason James Miller (born August 24, 1998) is an American professional baseball pitcher in the Oakland Athletics organization.

Miller attended Bethel Park High School in Bethel Park, Pennsylvania and played college baseball at Waynesburg University for three years before transferring to Gardner-Webb University. As a sophomore at Waynesburg, he was diagnosed with Type 1 diabetes.

Miller was drafted by the Oakland Athletics in the ninth round of the 2021 Major League Baseball draft. He made his professional debut that year with the Arizona Complex League Athletics. In 2022, Miller pitched in only six games between the ACL Athletics, Lansing Lugnuts and Las Vegas Aviators. After the season, he played in the Arizona Fall League.

Luis Morales

Luis Danys Morales (born September 24, 2002) is an Cuban professional baseball pitcher in the Oakland Athletics organization.

Morales was born in Cuba. He played for Gallos de Sancti Spíritus in Cuban National Series during the  2020–21 season, going 3-3 with a 5.95 ERA in 11 pitching appearances. While playing on the Cuba national team in the 2020 U-23 Baseball World Cup in Mexico City, Morales defected. He was ruled an international free agent by Major League Baseball for the 2023 MLB international signing period.

Morales was signed by the Oakland Athletics on January 16, 2023.

Ryan Noda

Ryan Anthony Noda (born March 30, 1996) is an American professional baseball first baseman and outfielder in the Oakland Athletics organization.

Noda attended Grant Community High School in Fox Lake, Illinois. He was not drafted after graduating, and then attended the University of Cincinnati, playing three seasons with the Bearcats. In his freshman season, Noda recorded a .230 batting average, seven home runs, and 32 runs batted in (RBI). In addition, he made a one-inning pitching appearance and did not allow a baserunner. After his freshman season in 2015, he played collegiate summer baseball for the Yarmouth–Dennis Red Sox of the Cape Cod Baseball League (CCBL), and helped lead the Red Sox to the league championship. As a sophomore, he batted .250 with six home runs and 34 RBI. Following his sophomore season in 2016, he returned to the CCBL, playing for the Brewster Whitecaps. In his final season with Cincinnati, Noda hit .236 with nine home runs and 36 RBI.

Noda was selected by the Toronto Blue Jays in the 15th round of the 2017 Major League Baseball draft, and assigned to the Rookie Advanced Bluefield Blue Jays of the Appalachian League. In 66 games, Noda recorded a .364 batting average, seven home runs, and 39 RBI. He was traded to the Los Angeles Dodgers on February 23, 2021, as the player to be named later in the deal that sent Ross Stripling to the Blue Jays in 2020. He was assigned to the Tulsa Drillers of the Double-A Central and played in 113 games for them, hitting .250 with 29 home runs and 78 RBI. He was selected as a post-season Double-A Central all-star.

Noda was promoted to the Triple-A Oklahoma City Dodgers to begin the 2022 season,  where he played in 135 games with a .259 average, 25 RBI and 90 RBI.

On December 7, 2022, Noda was selected by the Oakland Athletics with the second pick of the Rule 5 Draft.

Colin Peluse

Colin Robert Peluse (born June 11, 1998) is an American professional baseball pitcher in the Oakland Athletics organization.

Peluse attended Middletown High School in Middletown, Delaware and played college baseball at Wake Forest University. In 2018, he played collegiate summer baseball with the Chatham Anglers of the Cape Cod Baseball League. He was drafted by the Oakland Athletics in the ninth round of the 2019 Major League Baseball draft. He made his professional debut that year with the Vermont Lake Monsters.

Peluse did not play a minor league game in 2020 because the season was cancelled due to the COVID-19 pandemic. He pitched 2021 with the Lansing Lugnuts and Midland RockHounds, and was a combined 9-3.

Miguel Romero

Luis Miguel Romero (born April 23, 1994) is a Cuban professional baseball pitcher in the Oakland Athletics organization.

Romero played for Guantánamo in the Cuban National Series from 2012 to 2016. He signed with the Oakland Athletics as a free agent on February 1, 2017.

Romero's first affiliated season was split between the rookie-level AZL Athletics, the Single-A Beloit Snappers, and the High-A Stockton Ports, where he accumulated a 4.88 ERA in 14 total appearances. In 2018, Romero split the year between Stockton and the Double-A Midland RockHounds, pitching to a 3.94 ERA with 66 strikeouts in 59.1 innings pitched across 44 appearances. Romero spent the 2019 season with the Triple-A Las Vegas Aviators, recording a 3.96 ERA with 81 strikeouts across 45 contests. Romero did not play in a game in 2020 due to the cancellation of the minor league season because of the COVID-19 pandemic. The Athletics added him to their 40-man roster following the 2020 season on November 20, 2020.

Romero was assigned to Triple-A Las Vegas in 2021, but struggled to a 6.27 ERA in 28 appearances for the team. On September 8, 2021, Romero was promoted to the major leagues for the first time. However, he spent 13 days on the active roster without appearing in a game and was optioned back to Triple-A on September 21. This earned him the distinction of being a phantom ballplayer, having spent time on the major league team's active roster without having a major league appearance. On March 27, 2022, it was announced that Romero would be optioned to Triple-A Las Vegas to begin the 2022 season. He was designated for assignment on April 21, 2022. He cleared waivers and was sent outright to Triple-A on April 23.

Royber Salinas

Royber Adrian Salinas (born April 10, 2001) is a Venezuelan professional baseball pitcher in the Oakland Athletics organization.

Salinas signed with the Atlanta Braves as an international free agent in October 2018. He made his professional debut in 2019 with the Dominican Summer League Braves.

Salinas did not play for a team in 2020 due to the Minor League Baseball season being cancelled because of the Covid-19 pandemic. He returned in 2021 to pitch for the Florida Complex League Braves and Augusta GreenJackets. He pitched 2022 with Augusta and Rome Braves.

On December 12, 2022, Salinas was traded to the Oakland Athletics with Kyle Muller, Manny Pina, and Freddy Tarnok.

Max Schuemann

Maxwell Carter Schuemann (born June 11, 1997) is an American professional baseball infielder and outfielder in the Oakland Athletics organization.

Schuemann attended Portage Northern High School in Portage, Michigan, where he played basketball and baseball. In 2014, his junior year, he hit .490 with 33 RBIs. He went unselected in the 2015 Major League Baseball draft and enrolled at Eastern Michigan University where he played college baseball. In 2018, his junior year, he batted .317 with four home runs, 30 RBIs, and 24 stolen bases over 56 games. After the season's end, he was selected by the Oakland Athletics in the 20th round of the 2018 Major League Baseball draft.

Schuemann signed with Oakland and made his professional debut with the Vermont Lake Monsters of the Class A Short Season New York–Penn League, batting .195 over 45 games. In 2019, he played with the Beloit Snappers of the Class A Midwest League with whom he hit .256 with three home runs, 35 RBIs, and 25 steals over 94 games. He began the 2021 season with the Lansing Lugnuts of the High-A Central, with whom he set a franchise record with five stolen bases in one game. He was promoted to the Midland RockHounds of the Double-A Central and the Las Vegas Aviators of the Triple-A West during the season. Over 119 games between the three clubs, Schuemann slashed .271/.372/.388 with seven home runs, 42 RBIs, and 52 stolen bases. He returned to Midland to begin the 2022 season. In mid-July, he was promoted to Las Vegas, but was assigned back to Midland shortly after. Over ninety games between the two teams, he compiled a slash line of .274/.403/.422 with nine home runs, 41 RBIs, and 24 stolen bases.

Eastern Michigan Eagles bio

Full Triple-A to Rookie League rosters

Triple-A

Double-A

High-A

Single-A

Rookie

Foreign Rookie

References

Minor league players
Lists of minor league baseball players